Gopalpur Assembly constituency may refer to

 Gopalpur, Bihar Assembly constituency
 Gopalpur, Odisha Assembly constituency
 Gopalpur, Uttar Pradesh Assembly constituency